Marymount.  Its boundary is made up of Ang Mo Kio Avenue 1 Ang Mo Kio, Singapore in the north; Bishan Road Bishan, Singapore  in the east; Braddell Road in the south; and Marymount Road in the west, Shunfu, Sin Ming.

Etymology
The area takes its name from the Marymount Convent School, which in turn was named after August, the month of Mary.

References

Bishan, Singapore
Central Region, Singapore